The 2010–11 NCAA Division II men's ice hockey season began on October 29, 2010 and concluded on March 5 of the following year. This was the 29th season of second-tier college ice hockey.

Regular season

Standings

See also
 2010–11 NCAA Division I men's ice hockey season
 2010–11 NCAA Division III men's ice hockey season

References

External links

 
NCAA